The Derg was a military junta that ruled Ethiopia from 1974 to 1987.

Derg may also refer to:

 Derg, Iran
 Bodb Derg, a legendary figure in Irish mythology
 Cróeb Derg, or Red Branch, the name of two royal houses of Ulster
 Lough Derg (disambiguation)
 River Derg, Ireland

See also 
 Durg